Alfred Théodore Marie Vanderstegen (26 January 1869 – 7 January 1959) was a Belgian engineer, entrepreneur and liberal politician. He graduated as an engineer from the University of Ghent. He was the son of Henricus Vanderstegen and Rosa de Cavel.  Current descendants are the Vanderstegen family in Ghent.

During his political career he became municipality Council member in Ghent (1907–1947), burgomaster of Ghent (1921–1946) and senator (1936–1947) for the liberal party.

Sources
 Alfred Vanderstegen (Liberal archive)

1869 births
1959 deaths
Engineers from Ghent
Mayors of Ghent
Flemish politicians